Falzarego may refer to:

 The Falzarego Pass, in Italy
 , an Italian merchant ship in service 1960–64